The 2020 United States Senate election in North Carolina was held on November 3, 2020, to elect a member of the United States Senate to represent the State of North Carolina, concurrently with the 2020 United States presidential election as well as other elections to the United States Senate in other states and elections to the United States House of Representatives and various state and local elections. North Carolina was one of just five states holding presidential, gubernatorial, and senatorial elections concurrently in 2020. On March 3, 2020, incumbent Thom Tillis and former State Senator Cal Cunningham won their respective primaries.

Most experts and pollsters considered Cunningham to be the favorite; Tillis outperformed pre-election polling to win a narrow victory, successfully breaking the "one-term curse" that existed with this particular Senate seat for over thirty years, as many of Tillis's predecessors only served one term. On November 10, 2020, a week after election day, Cunningham called Tillis to concede the race. Tillis won by a margin of 1.8% over Cunningham, slightly larger than his 1.5% victory in 2014.

Republican primary

Candidates

Nominee
Thom Tillis, incumbent U.S. Senator

Eliminated in primary
Larry Holmquist, candidate for U.S. Senate in 2016
Sharon Hudson, activist
Paul Wright, former North Carolina Superior Court judge, perennial candidate, and candidate for U.S. Senate in 2016

Withdrawn
Sandy Smith, farm owner (running for U.S. House in NC-01)
Garland Tucker, former CEO and chairman of Triangle Capital

Declined
Mark Meadows, former U.S. Representative for North Carolina's 11th congressional district
Ted Budd, incumbent U.S. Representative for North Carolina's 13th congressional district
Mark Walker, incumbent U.S. Representative for North Carolina's 6th congressional district

Endorsements

Polling

with only Thom Tillis and Mark Walker

with Thom Tillis and Generic Republican

Results

Democratic primary

Candidates

Nominee
Cal Cunningham, former state senator and candidate for the U.S. Senate in 2010

Eliminated in primary
Trevor Fuller, Mecklenburg County commissioner
Atul Goel, physician and former United States Air Force officer
Erica D. Smith, state senator
Steve Swenson

Withdrawn
Katherine Bell-Moore
Eva F. Lee, attorney (running for North Carolina Commissioner of Labor)
Eric L. Mansfield, former state senator
Steve Williams

Declined
Janet Cowell, former North Carolina State Treasurer (endorsed Cunningham)
Anthony Foxx, former U.S. Secretary of Transportation and former mayor of Charlotte (endorsed Cunningham)
Rachel Hunt, state representative
Vi Lyles, mayor of Charlotte
Dan McCready, former U.S. Marine, businessman, and nominee for North Carolina's 9th congressional district in 2018 and 2019 special election
Deborah K. Ross, former state representative and nominee for U.S. Senate in 2016 (running for North Carolina's 2nd congressional district)
Thomas W. Ross, former president of the University of North Carolina system
Josh Stein, North Carolina Attorney General (running for reelection)
Brian Turner, state representative

Endorsements

Polling

Results

Other candidates

Libertarian Party

Nominee
Shannon Bray, U.S. Navy veteran, author, and candidate for North Carolina's 3rd congressional district in 2019

Constitution Party

Nominee
Kevin E. Hayes, candidate for the North Carolina House of Representatives in 2012 and 2018

Independence Party

Withdrawn
Jeremy Thomas

Independent write-in candidates

Withdrawn
Marcia Abrams
Lee Brian
Matthew Cisneros
Michelle Parks
Sunita Singh

General election

Campaign
During the Democratic primary, a Republican-funded Super PAC spent $3 million on ads attacking Cunningham and promoting left-wing rival Erica Smith.

Cunningham and Tillis participated in debates on September 13, September 22, and October 1.

In July, Tillis claimed Cunningham had been "silent" on the issue of defunding the police, saying,—"I assume [his] silence is ...consent". In reality, Cunningham had spoken publicly about the issue and written an op-ed a month earlier stating his opposition to defunding the police, advocating police reform instead.

On October 3, the New York Times wrote that the race had fallen into "utter mayhem" within a period of a few hours after Tillis tested positive for COVID-19 and Cunningham admitted to exchanging sexual text messages with a woman who was not his wife, damaging an image that leaned heavily on his character and military service. Days later, the woman confirmed that she had a consensual physical relationship with Cunningham in 2020. The Army Reserve started an investigation into Cunningham. The husband of the woman who confirmed having an affair with Cunningham, himself an Army veteran, called on Cunningham to drop out of the Senate race. Asked repeatedly whether he had had other extramarital affairs, Cunningham declined to answer.

Tillis's diagnosis, which came after an outbreak at a White House ceremony for Supreme Court nominee Amy Coney Barrett, temporarily threw Barrett's confirmation into jeopardy, as two Republican senators had already stated their intention to vote against (though one of them would eventually vote in favor of her confirmation).

Predictions

Endorsements

Fundraising
In the first quarter of 2020, Cunningham outraised Tillis for the first time, receiving $4.4 million compared to the $2.1 million Tillis raised.  Tillis's prior fundraising, however, left him with the advantage in cash on hand, with $6.5 million in the bank, compared to Cunningham's $3 million.

Polling

Graphical summary

Aggregate polls

Tillis vs. Cunningham

with Erica D. Smith

with Generic Democrat

with Thom Tillis and Generic Opponent

with Generic Republican and Generic Democrat

Results 
Like many Republican Senate candidates in 2020, Tillis did much better on Election Day than pre-election prediction polling indicated. The senator narrowly defeated Cunningham 48.7 to 46.9 and slightly outperformed President Trump in terms of margin of victory. Tillis's upset victory has been largely attributed to Cunningham's response to his affair as well as Tillis's fierce campaigning during the last few weeks of the campaign.

Counties that flipped from Democratic to Republican
 Bladen (largest municipality: Elizabethtown)
 Gates (largest municipality: Gatesville)
 Granville (largest municipality: Oxford)
 Hyde (largest municipality: Ocracoke)
 Jackson (largest municipality: Cullowhee)
 Lenoir (largest municipality: Kinston)
 Martin (largest municipality: Williamston)
 Pasquotank (largest municipality: Elizabeth City)
 Richmond (largest municipality: Rockingham)
 Robeson (largest municipality: Lumberton)
 Scotland (largest municipality: Laurinburg)

Counties that flipped from Republican to Democratic
 Nash (largest municipality: Rocky Mount)
 New Hanover (largest municipality: Wilmington)
 Watauga (largest municipality: Boone)

See also
 2020 North Carolina elections

Notes
Partisan clients

Voter samples and additional candidates

References

Further reading

External links
  (State affiliate of the U.S. League of Women Voters)
 
 
 
 

Official campaign websites
 Shannon Bray (L) for Senate
 Cal Cunningham (D) for Senate
 Thom Tillis (R) for Senate
  (State affiliate of the U.S. League of Women Voters)

2020
North Carolina
United States Senate